Sir James Laurence Cotter, 3rd Baronet (1782 – 31 December 1834) was an Anglo-Irish politician and baronet.

Cotter was the son of Sir James Cotter, 2nd Baronet and Isabella Hingston, and the grandson of Sir James Cotter. In the 1812 United Kingdom general election, he was elected as the Member of Parliament for Mallow, and he held the seat until 1818. On 9 February 1829, he succeeded to his father's baronetcy.

He married Helena Tryndall Lombard, daughter of Major James Lombard and Ann Becher, on 1 January 1820. Cotter was succeeded in his title his son, also called James.

References

1782 births
1834 deaths
19th-century Anglo-Irish people
James
Baronets in the Baronetage of Ireland
UK MPs 1812–1818
Members of the Parliament of the United Kingdom for County Cork constituencies (1801–1922)